Mykolaivka is an urban-type settlement (a town) in Simferopol Raion of the Autonomous Republic of Crimea, a territory recognized by a majority of countries as part of Ukraine and incorporated by Russia as the Republic of Crimea. Population: 

It is located on shore of Black Sea 40 km from Simferopol. Mykolaivka is considered as a "Simferopol's Beach;" being the closest sea shore it attracts many week-enders from the city.

References

Urban-type settlements in Crimea
Simferopol Raion